James England Burris Jr. (born October 16, 1944) is a former American football defensive back who played three seasons with the New Orleans Saints of the National Football League (NFL). He was drafted by the Saints in the second round of the 1967 NFL Draft. He played college football at the University of Houston and attended Brazosport High School in Freeport, Texas. Burris played quarterback for the Houston Cougars and also played baseball as an outfielder.

See also
 List of NCAA major college football yearly passing leaders

References

External links
Just Sports Stats

Living people
1944 births
Players of American football from Texas
Baseball players from Texas
American football defensive backs
American football quarterbacks
Houston Cougars football players
Houston Cougars baseball players
New Orleans Saints players
People from Luling, Texas